Kim Hee-gon (Korean: 김희곤; born on 4 November 1985) is a South Korean football referee who is a listed international referee for FIFA since 2013.

He was active in the AFC Champions League, AFC Cup, and AFF Suzuki Cup, and was also a soccer instructor.

In the first leg of the playoff game between Daejeon FC and Gwangju FC, on 28 November 2018, Lee Seung-mo fell from his head and lost consciousness in an aerial ball competition with Yoon Kyung-bo in the first half. It is said that he regained consciousness in two minutes thanks to the quick response of the doctor and quick emergency rescue.

References

External links
 WorldReferee 프로필

1985 births
Living people
South Korean football referees